Nachlana is a village in Ramban district in the Indian union territory of Jammu and Kashmir.

References

Villages in Ramban district